is a Japanese manga artist and designer.

Overview
Yamashita was born in the Gifu Prefecture and is a graduate of the Nagoya University of Arts. His representative work in manga is "Dark Whisper" (serialized in Dengeki Daioh). In the field of anime, he is the mecha designer for the Neon Genesis Evangelion series (along with Hideaki Anno) and Sentō Yōsei Yukikaze. The designs for Yukikaze were originally drawn as recreation, as well as Sentō Yōsei Shōjo tasuke te! Mave-chan. Besides Evangelion, he has also done mecha designs for other Gainax works including Gunbuster and Nadia: The Secret of Blue Water. He was also the mechanical designer for Blue Submarine No. 6.

References

External links 

Living people
1965 births
Manga artists
Mechanical designers (mecha)